Cynan ap Maredudd (died 1295) was a Welsh nobleman who assumed leadership of the Welsh revolt of Madog ap Llywelyn in the mid-Wales area in 1294 and 1295.

He is recorded in the Welsh chronicle Brut y Tywysogyon as having jointly led the revolt in Deheubarth with Maelgwn ap Rhys (died 1295), but this seems unlikely given his known activities were confined to territories well to the north of those of Maelgwn. He is known to have besieged Builth Castle, and also attacked the castle at Cefnllys. After the collapse of the revolt in the summer of 1295, he was captured, apparently at Hereford, and executed.

See also

 Madog ap Llywelyn

References
 Thomas Jones (ed.), Brut Y Tywysogyon or Chronicle of the Princes (Peniarth Ms. 20 Version) (Cardiff, 1952).

History of Wales
1295 deaths
Year of birth unknown